Donald Walter Murdoch (born October 25, 1956) is a Canadian former professional ice hockey player. He played in the National Hockey League with the New York Rangers, Edmonton Oilers, and Detroit Red Wings between 1976 and 1982. He was featured in the 1979 Stanley Cup Finals, playing with the Rangers.

Playing career
After a standout junior career with the Medicine Hat Tigers, Murdoch was selected 6th overall in the 1976 NHL Amateur Draft by the New York Rangers, and joined the team that year as a 20-year-old. He scored 56 points in 59 games his rookie season, including a Rangers rookie record of 32 goals, and finished as runner-up for the Calder Trophy for best rookie. On October 12, 1976, Murdoch tied Howie Meeker's record for most goals in one game by a rookie with 5, against the Minnesota North Stars. A torn Achilles tendon ended his season in February.

In summer of 1977, Murdoch was caught by customs agents in Toronto with 4.5 grams of cocaine stashed in his socks. He was suspended by the league for the entire 1978–79 season (later reduced to 40 games) and later admitted to having a drinking and drug problem.

He played 320 career games in the National Hockey League (NHL) but never regained the form of his first season, and retired after stops with the Edmonton Oilers and Detroit Red Wings.

After his playing career, Murdoch worked as a scout for the Tampa Bay Lightning, under general manager Phil Esposito.

Don is the brother of Bob Murdoch.

Legacy
In the 2009 book 100 Ranger Greats, the authors ranked Murdoch at No. 99 all-time of the 901 New York Rangers who had played during the team's first 82 seasons.

Career statistics

Regular season and playoffs

Awards
 WCHL All-Star Team – 1975
 WCHL First All-Star Team – 1976

See also
 List of players with 5 or more goals in an NHL game

External links

References

1956 births
Living people
Adirondack Red Wings players
Canadian ice hockey right wingers
Canadian sportspeople in doping cases
Cincinnati Stingers draft picks
Detroit Red Wings players
Doping cases in ice hockey
Edmonton Oilers players
Ice hockey people from British Columbia
Indianapolis Checkers players
Medicine Hat Tigers players
Montana Magic players
Muskegon Lumberjacks players
National Hockey League first-round draft picks
New York Rangers draft picks
New York Rangers players
New York Rangers scouts
Sportspeople from Cranbrook, British Columbia
Tampa Bay Lightning executives
Tampa Bay Lightning scouts
Toledo Goaldiggers players
Vernon Vikings players